This is a list of public holidays in Curaçao.

References

Curaçao
Curaçao
Curaçao culture
Curaçao